Jiangqiao Mongol Town or Ha-la-erh-ka, is a town on the southwestern (left) bank of the Nen River in Tailai County, western Heilongjiang province, People's Republic of China. , it has one residential community and 6 villages under its administration.

History
The Nenjiang Chinese Eastern Railway railroad bridge across the river was the site of first battles of the Second Sino-Japanese War.

See also
List of township-level divisions of Heilongjiang

References

External links

Township-level divisions of Heilongjiang
Mongols in China
Tailai County
Ethnic townships of the People's Republic of China